The National Architecture Award of Spain is an honor granted annually by the Government of Spain. It was first given in 1932, had a hiatus during the Civil War, and resumed in 1944, although it is not convened every year.

At its establishment it was awarded to a particular work, but since 2001 it has been awarded to an architect for the whole of their work. The latter has simply been called the National Housing Award since 2009.

In 2013, the National Architecture Award was once again combined into a single prize. The winner is selected by a jury (which nominates a candidate or declares the award will not be given), and the award is granted by order of the Minister of Development.

Winners

1932–2000

2001–present

References

External links
 

1932 establishments in Spain
Architecture awards
Awards established in 1932
Spanish awards